The 2003 Quebec general election was held on April 14, 2003, to elect members of the National Assembly of Quebec (Canada). The Parti libéral du Québec (PLQ), led by Jean Charest, defeated the incumbent Parti Québécois, led by Premier Bernard Landry.

In Champlain there was a tie between PQ candidate Noëlla Champagne and Liberal candidate Pierre-A. Brouillette; although the initial tally was 11,867 to 11,859, a judicial recount produced a tally of 11,852 each. A new election was held on May 20 and was won by Champagne by a margin of 642 votes.

Unfolding

In January 2001, Lucien Bouchard announced that he would resign from public life, citing that the results of his work were not very convincing. In March 2001, the Parti Québécois selected Bernard Landry as leader by acclamation, thus becoming premier of Quebec. In 2002, the Parti Québécois (PQ) government had been in power for two mandates. It was seen as worn-out by some, and its poll numbers fell sharply. It placed third at its lowest point. An important part of its support was going to the Action Démocratique du Québec (ADQ) and its young leader, Mario Dumont. Some PQ supporters had left for the Liberal party.

Landry, leader of the PQ, undertook a revitalization of the party and its image. As the ideas of the conservative nature of ADQ's platform became more apparent, that party's popularity declined. Social democratic measures taken by the PQ government, like the passing of the "Law against poverty" helped improve the PQ's standing in the public opinion polls. PLQ leader Jean Charest initially continued to be unpopular with voters.

The 2003 election happened against the backdrop of the war in Iraq. The battles of that war took place during the first half of the campaign, diverting the attention of the media and the population. Landry became known for his custom of wearing the white ribbon (which in 2003 was worn by people in favour of peace). This custom was shortly followed by the two other main party leaders, Charest and Dumont. Landry was the most outspoken critic of the war. The other two were more discreet on the matter. Charest once stated that it was an opportunity to reaffirm his "belief in peace". Dumont acted in a similar way, while also addressing criticism to Landry, saying that Quebecers should refrain from criticizing Americans too harshly since Americans were historical friends of Quebecers.

The desire for change was considered an important factor of the campaign (see "Change", below). However, while reminding voters that the fundamental change was at the core of its primary ideal, sovereignty, the PQ focused its message and publicity not on change, but on stability. Its campaign slogan emphasized this (see the Campaign slogans below). Landry also tried to portray the vote as being a choice between the left wing PQ and two parties of the right. The PLQ portrayed itself as centrist. The PLQ produced dynamic ads and material, and released a new, younger logo. The ADQ put forward its young, underdog leader, and denied being too much to the right. It first broadcast a negative advertisement (a bleak television spot speaking of deaths in the hospitals) that backfired substantially, with criticism from opponents and citizens. It shortly released a brighter, more positive advertising.

Despite the PQ's recovery of support, Charest appeared as a viable alternative for people in desire of change, especially during the Leaders' Debate. Also, the Parizeau Affair sparked by Charest is said to have harmed Landry's campaign up to election day. The PQ lead in the public opinion polls vanished by mid-campaign.

The Parti Libéral won the election, while Parti Québécois won a respectable number of seats. The ADQ won four seats, which was a considerable improvement from previous general elections. It was nonetheless a disappointment for the party since it had five sitting members as a result of by-election victories in the previous year. It had also had a high standing in the polls of that same year.  This was the first general election for the new left-wing Union des forces progressistes.

A documentary about Bernard Landry's point of view of the campaign was released in 2003 called À Hauteur d'homme. It was directed by Jean-Claude Labrecque.

Issues

Health care
Jean Charest and the PLQ focused their campaign upon the issue of health care and reducing waiting lists. The other major parties criticized Charest for planning to invest only in health care and education, while freezing other budgets. Landry argued that money for health care would be available when the fiscal imbalance was solved by sovereignty. He vowed to fight for money from Ottawa until then, as he had done earlier that year (see the "Fiscal Imbalance", below). Charest portrayed Landry as putting sovereignty ahead of health care, and presented his party as the one that would make health care its first priority. He also accused Landry's government of using waiting lists as an administration procedure for hospitals.

Change
The desire for change was considered by the media to be a major deciding factor of the vote. The media were criticized by the PQ and some citizens as "wanting change for the sake of change", since the government had ended its term with an economy doing well and high satisfaction polls for an outgoing administration. Landry reminded voters that, while voting for his party did not change the government right away, the first ideal of the PQ, sovereignty, was "the greatest of changes". At the Leaders' Debate, Charest told viewers that those wanting change should vote for the PLQ since "A vote for the ADQ is a vote for the PQ". At the time, the ADQ was considered to be too low in the polls to be a potential victor. Charest's reminder of the spoiler effect is said to have been partly responsible for his victory on election day. The results on election day appear to have demonstrated the voters' desire for change.

Income tax
Charest presented a plan of major reduction of income tax, which Landry opposed. Quebec's income taxes are the highest in North America, but its social programs are also relatively generous, and the gap between rich and poor is the lowest of the North American continent. The ADQ presented a flat tax plan in 2002. This proved to be highly unpopular, and contributed to the image of the party as being too conservative. This plan, in its pure form, was dropped in the beginning of 2003. The ADQ claimed that, after further examination, the Quebec government did not have the resources to implement it. This, again, hurt the party further by giving it the image of flip flopping.

State size and intervention
The PQ government was criticized by the two other major parties for being too interventionist, maintaining an overly large government, and for practising statism. Dumont spoke of Landry and the PQ's "Social bureaucracy", a pun on the Social democracy the PQ defends. Landry responded to Charest and Dumont that "Quebecers do not want less state, they want better state".  Dumont had previously proposed a drastic reduction in the size of the civil service, but this was also softened before the campaign.

Family-work conciliation
The conciliation famille-travail became an important issue of the campaign as a result of Landry's "Four day work-week" plan. This proposal would have required Quebec employers to offer the option of a four-day work week to parents. This was presented by the PQ as a way to enhance family life, lower the stress on parents, and of counteracting the fall in Quebec's birthrate since the Quiet Revolution. The plan was attacked by the PLQ and ADQ as being  "improvised" since it was only presented near the beginning of the election. It attracted some interest and support from voters, enough for Charest to declare, days before voting day, that he could consider implementing a four-day week, although the PLQ has not mentioned this since the election.

Fiscal imbalance
The theory of a fiscal imbalance between Ottawa and Quebec City was maintained and denounced by all major parties. Charest argued that the co-operative approach of a federalist party like the PLQ would be more effective solving the problem. As proof that the PQ would be able to solve the fiscal imbalance, Landry pointed to his success of early 2003, when he, along with the English Canadian Premiers, managed to come to an agreement with Prime Minister of Canada Jean Chrétien for more money to finance health care. He promised to continue the "battle" to solve the imbalance until independence is achieved.

City mergers
The PQ government, during the premiership of Landry's predecessor Lucien Bouchard, had merged the major cities of Quebec. The government argued that the mergers would allow a better division of the wealth and responsibilities between richer suburban communities and poorer parts of the main cities. The mergers occurred despite widespread opposition in some municipalities. Many Quebecers were still disgruntled, especially in wealthier and anglophone communities. The PLQ proposed to allow referendums on de-amalgamation in communities where there was sufficient support. The PQ and the ADQ strongly opposed the idea.

Sovereignty and autonomy
While the PQ continued to promote sovereignty for Quebec with its usual arguments (dignity, culture, globalization, etc.), it was also presented by the PQ as a way to solve the fiscal imbalance problem. The ADQ made great efforts to avoid taking a position on the subject of independence in order to attract both sides of the National Question spectrum. The ADQ positioned itself as a "third way" to Quebecers between what Dumont called "radical separation" and "knelt down federalism". The ADQ had worked in favour of sovereignty during the 1995 Quebec referendum, but had been equivocal on the subject since then.

The PLQ criticized the PQ for using the politics of confrontation because of its sovereignty position, and argued that a PLQ government would restore Quebec's "leadership role" in the federation. Landry promised a third referendum on independence "in 1000 days", confirming the plan he had set out in the Declaration of Gatineau, with support for independence running very low and support for a referendum running even lower in opinion polls; this did not prove to be a popular position. An argument of Landry for this timetable was that he wanted Quebec to be present at the Summit of the Americas in Buenos Aires in 2005. Representation for Quebec had been denied by Ottawa at the previous summit held in Quebec City, an act that angered many Quebecers. At the same time, Landry kept the door opened to federalist support for the PQ and stated that he would only hold a referendum if he had the "moral assurance" of winning it. This lead Charest to accuse him of having a "hidden agenda", during the Leaders' Debate.

Parizeau Affair
On the day of the leaders' debate, Charest's advisors gave him an article from the website of the Trois-Rivières newspaper Le Nouvelliste that spoke of past PQ leader Jacques Parizeau restating his controversial remarks about "money and the ethnic vote" which he had made in his 1995 referendum concession speech. The truth of the article was later disputed, yet despite the uncertainty surrounding this article, Charest surprised Landry with it during the leaders' debate on live television. This created a new controversy that ran for some days following the debate, and was said to have hurt Landry's campaign. The PQ denounced Charest for launching an "immoral attack" on Parizeau's reputation and dignity, saying that the article was incorrect in concluding that he had repeated his comments, but this method of response was not enough to defuse the controversy. The aftermath of the leaders' debate is thoroughly treated in the À Hauteur d'homme documentary, and became known as the Parizeau Affair.

Day care
The "five dollar-a-day child care" program implemented by the PQ government of Lucien Bouchard was one of the most appreciated achievements of the recent PQ administration. Some parents still did not have access to it, however, because of a lack of sufficient places.  Landry, who had been Minister of Finance when the plan was implemented, vowed to continue creating more spaces. Charest presented his team as the most capable for this task. He also vowed to keep the price at $5 a day. He broke this promise later that year. See Opposition to the Charest government.

Public debt
The Action Démocratique insisted that the Government of Quebec should pay down the public debt. The other major leaders did not see it as a priority.

Contenders

Major parties

Action démocratique du Québec

Quebec Liberal Party

Parti Québécois

Minor parties

Bloc Pot

Union des forces progressistes

Campaign slogans
Action démocratique du Québec: L'avenir autrement (The future differently)
Quebec Liberal Party: Nous sommes prêts (We are ready)
Parti Québécois: Restons forts (Let us stay strong)

Incumbent MNAs not running for re-election

Overall Results 
The overall results were:

|- style="background-color:#CCCCCC;text-align:center;"
!rowspan="2" colspan="2" style="text-align:left;" |Party
!rowspan="2" style="text-align:left;" |Party leader
!rowspan="2"|Candi-dates
!colspan="3" style="text-align:center;"|Seats
!colspan="3" style="text-align:center;"|Popular vote
|- style="background-color:#CCCCCC"
| style="text-align:center;" |1998
| style="text-align:center;" |Elected
| style="text-align:center;" |% Change
| style="text-align:center;" |#
| style="text-align:center;" |%
| style="text-align:center;" |% Change

| style="text-align:left;" |Jean Charest
| style="text-align:right;" |125
| style="text-align:right;" |48
| style="text-align:right;" |76
| style="text-align:right;" |+58.3%
| style="text-align:right;" |  1,755,863
| style="text-align:right;" |45.99%
| style="text-align:right;" |+2.44%

| style="text-align:left;" |Bernard Landry
| style="text-align:right;" |125
| style="text-align:right;" |76
| style="text-align:right;" |45
| style="text-align:right;" |-40.8%
| style="text-align:right;" |  1,269,183
| style="text-align:right;" |33.24%
| style="text-align:right;" |-9.63%

| style="text-align:left;" |Mario Dumont
| style="text-align:right;" |125
| style="text-align:right;" |1
| style="text-align:right;" |4
| style="text-align:right;" |+300%
| style="text-align:right;" |     694,122
| style="text-align:right;" |18.18%
| style="text-align:right;" |+6.37%

| style="text-align:left;" |(leading council)
| style="text-align:right;" |74
| style="text-align:right;" |-
| style="text-align:right;" |-
| style="text-align:right;" |-
| style="text-align:right;" |40,422
| style="text-align:right;" |1.06%
| style="text-align:right;" |+0.42%

| style="text-align:left;" |Hugô St-Onge
| style="text-align:right;" |56
| style="text-align:right;" |-
| style="text-align:right;" |-
| style="text-align:right;" |-
| style="text-align:right;" |22,904
| style="text-align:right;" |0.60%
| style="text-align:right;" |+0.36%

| style="text-align:left;" |Richard Savignac
| style="text-align:right;" |37
| style="text-align:right;" |*
| style="text-align:right;" |-
| style="text-align:right;" |*
| style="text-align:right;" | 16,975
| style="text-align:right;" |0.44%
| style="text-align:right;" |*

| style="text-align:left;" |Keith Henderson
| style="text-align:right;" |21
| style="text-align:right;" |-
| style="text-align:right;" |-
| style="text-align:right;" |-
| style="text-align:right;" |4,051
| style="text-align:right;" |0.11%
| style="text-align:right;" |-0.2%

| style="text-align:left;" |Gilles Noël
| style="text-align:right;" |25
| style="text-align:right;" |*
| style="text-align:right;" |-
| style="text-align:right;" |*
| style="text-align:right;" |3,226
| style="text-align:right;" |0.08%
| style="text-align:right;" |*

| style="text-align:left;" |Claude Brunelle
| style="text-align:right;" |23
| style="text-align:right;" |-
| style="text-align:right;" |-
| style="text-align:right;" |-
| style="text-align:right;" | 2,749
| style="text-align:right;" |0.07%
| style="text-align:right;" |-

| style="text-align:left;" colspan="2"|Independent/no designation
| style="text-align:right;" |35
| style="text-align:right;" |-
| style="text-align:right;" |-
| style="text-align:right;" |-
| style="text-align:right;" | 8,269
| style="text-align:right;" |0.22%
| style="text-align:right;" |-0.09%
|-
| style="text-align:left;" colspan="3"|Total
! style="text-align:right;" |646
! style="text-align:right;" |125
! style="text-align:right;" |125
! style="text-align:right;" |-
! style="text-align:right;" |  3,817,764
! style="text-align:right;" |100%
! style="text-align:right;" | 
|-
| style="text-align:left;" colspan="10" |Source: Elections Quebec
|-
| style="text-align:left;" colspan="10" |Note:
* Party did not nominate candidates in the previous election.
|}

Results by riding 
The results in each riding (electoral division) were:

Bas-Saint-Laurent and Gaspésie–Îles-de-la-Madeleine

|-
|bgcolor=whitesmoke|Bonaventure
||
|Nathalie Normandeau 11,975
|
|Marc Tétreault 6,313
|
|Maurice Anglehart 1,101
|
|Michel Goudreau (Green) 542
||
|Nathalie Normandeau
|-
|bgcolor=whitesmoke|Gaspé
|
|Johnny Gérard 8,052
||
|Guy Lelièvre 9,033
|
|Denis Paradis 1,743
|
|Luc-Reno Fournier (Green) 227
||
|Guy Lelièvre
|-
|bgcolor=whitesmoke|Îles-de-la-Madeleine
|
|Simone LeBlanc 3,150
||
|Maxime Arseneau 4,606
|
|Évé Longuépée 92
|
|
||
|Maxime Arseneau
|-
|bgcolor=whitesmoke|Kamouraska-Témiscouata
||
|Claude Béchard 11,266
|
|Harold LeBel 6,326
|
|Pierre Lévesque 6,504
|
|Guy Duguay (Green) 293Robert Raymond (Ind.) 238
||
|Claude Béchard
|-
|bgcolor=whitesmoke|Matane
||
|Nancy Charest 7,602
|
|Pascal Bérubé 7,569
|
|Raynald Bernier 3,005
|
|Nelson Gauthier (Ind.) 178Nestor Turcotte (Ind.) 135David Lejeune (Green) 124
|
|align=center|Vacant
|-
|bgcolor=whitesmoke|Matapédia
|
|Gaston Pelletier 6,339
||
|Danielle Doyer 9,197
|
|Claude Fortin 4,686
|
|
||
|Danielle Doyer
|-
|bgcolor=whitesmoke|Rimouski
|
|Éric Forest 10,817
||
|Solange Charest 14,177
|
|Stéphane Laforest 4,719 
|
|
||
|Solange Charest
|-
|bgcolor=whitesmoke|Rivière-du-Loup
|
|Jacques Morin 5,585
|
|Carol Gilbert 4,155
||
|Mario Dumont 13,452
|
|Julie Morin (Green) 312
||
|Mario Dumont
|-
|}

Saguenay-Lac-St-Jean, Côte-Nord and Nord-du-Québec

|-
|bgcolor=whitesmoke|Chicoutimi
|
|Jean-Guy Maltais 11,814
||
|Stéphane Bédard 14,471
|
|Carl Savard 5,841
|
|Pierre Dostie (UFP) 670Dominic Tremblay (BP) 314
||
|Stéphane Bédard
|-
|bgcolor=whitesmoke|Dubuc
|
|Johnny Simard 9,723
||
|Jacques Côté 9,767
|
|Claude Gauthier 5,162
|
|Marie Francine Bienvenue (UFP) 457
||
|Jacques Côté
|-
|bgcolor=whitesmoke|Duplessis
|
|Marc Proulx 8,018
||
|Lorraine Richard 10,926
|
|Steeve Trudel 2,530
|
|André Forbes (Ind.) 1,334
||
|Normand Duguay
|-
|bgcolor=whitesmoke|Jonquière
||
|Françoise Gauthier 13,826
|
|Myrtha Laflamme 11,386
|
|Réjean Laforest 5,216
|
|Batiste Foisy (BP) 368Michel Perron (UFP) 330
||
|Françoise Gauthier
|-
|bgcolor=whitesmoke|Lac-Saint-Jean
|
|Benoît Harvey 7,405
||
|Stéphan Tremblay 15,200
|
|Roger Filion 5,694
|
|
||
|Stéphan Tremblay
|-
|bgcolor=whitesmoke|Réne-Lévesque
|
|François Désy 5,215
||
|Marjolain Dufour 8,997
|
|François Corriveau 7,356
|
|Jean-Pierre Brison (Ind.) 449
||
|François CorriveauSaguenay
|-
|bgcolor=whitesmoke|Roberval
||
|Karl Blackburn 11,930
|
|Réjean Lalancette 11,686
|
|Bernard Généreaux 6,388
|
|Francis Breton (UFP) 453
||
|Benoît Laprise
|-
|bgcolor=whitesmoke|Ungava
|
|Don Bubar 4,258
||
|Michel Létourneau 5,744
|
|Gloria Trudeau 1,460
|
|
||
|Michel Létourneau
|}

Capitale-Nationale

|-
|bgcolor=whitesmoke|Charlesbourg
||
|Éric Mercier 17,169
|
|Sylvie Tremblay 9,741
|
|Jonatan Julien 10,936
|
|Yonnel Bonaventure (Green) 438Simon Carreau (UFP) 329
||
|Jean Rochon
|-
|-
|bgcolor=whitesmoke|Charlevoix
|
|Denis Lavoie 8,758
||
|Rosaire Bertrand 10,131
|
|Daniel Bouchard 3,998
|
|Éric Tremblay (UFP) 168Gabriel Tremblay (Ind.) 105Phillippe Thivierge (DCQ) 62
||
|Rosaire Bertrand
|-
|bgcolor=whitesmoke|Chauveau
||
|Sarah Perreault 14,774
|
|Nathalie Samson 8,506
|
|Hélène Napert 12,555
|
|Christian Légaré (Ind.) 624Marie-Noëlle Béland (UFP) 387
||
|Raymond Brouillet
|-
|bgcolor=whitesmoke|Jean-Lesage
||
|Michel Després 15,547
|
|Robert Caron 9,408
|
|Aurel Bélanger 8,912
|
|Jean-Yves Desgagnés (Ind.) 714Nicolas Frichot (BP) 390Jean Bédard (M-L) 185
||
|Michel DesprésLimoilou
|-
|bgcolor=whitesmoke|Jean-Talon
||
|Margaret Delisle 15,475
|
|Daniel-Mercier Gouin 11,999
|
|Simon Lauzon 5,149
|
|Sacha Calixte (UFP) 515Antonine Yaccarini (Green) 477Sabrina Falardeau (BP) 197Robert Bonenfant (Ind.) 126
||
|Margaret Delisle
|-
|bgcolor=whitesmoke|La Peltrie
||
|France Hamel 16,462
|
|Claude Gendreau 8,711
|
|Éric Caire 13,421
|
|Dany Hamel (Ind.) 586Guillaume Boivin (UFP) 515
||
|Michel Côté
|-
|bgcolor=whitesmoke|Louis-Hébert
||
|Sam Hamad 17,938
|
|Line-Sylvie Perron 11,688
|
|Guy Laforest 9,505
|
|Jean-Pierre Guay (Green) 493Jean-Phillipe Lessard-Beaupré (UFP) 402Pierre Laliberté (BP) 281
||
|Paul Bégin
|-
|bgcolor=whitesmoke|Montmorency
||
|Raymond Bernier 13,708
|
|Jean-François Simard 11,226
|
|Jean-François Paquet 11,821
|
|Magali Paquin (UFP) 517
||
|Jean-François Simard
|-
|bgcolor=whitesmoke|Portneuf
||
|Jean-Pierre Soucy 12,729
|
|Roger Bertrand 8,352
|
|Deny Lépine 10,781
|
|François Paradis-Caron (UFP) 413
||
|Roger Bertrand
|-
|bgcolor=whitesmoke|Taschereau
|
|Michel Beaudoin 11,240
||
|Agnès Maltais 12,930
|
|Jean-Guy Lemieux 6,537
|
|Alain Marcoux (UFP) 1,136Dominic Lapointe (Green) 731Benjamin Kasapoglu (BP) 389Patrice Fortin (Ind.) 102Alain Cyr (Ind.) 95
||
|Agnès Maltais
|-
|bgcolor=whitesmoke|Vanier
||
|Marc Bellemare 16,182
|
|Nicole Madore 9,385
|
|Normand Morin 11,646
|
|Sébastien Bouchard (UFP) 573
||
|Diane Barbeau
|}

Mauricie

|-
|bgcolor=whitesmoke|Champlain  (May 20, 2003)
|
|Pierre Brouillette 9,431
||
|Noëlla Champagne 10,073
|
|Rock Laviolette 6,459
|
|Lucie Favreau (UFP) 103  Gilles Noel (DCQ) 73
||
|Yves Beaumier
|-
|bgcolor=whitesmoke|Laviolette
||
|Julie Boulet 12,806
|
|Patrick Lahaie 7,730
|
|Sébastien Proulx 3,453
|
|Yves Demers (UFP) 182
Josée Lafontaine (DCQ) 144
||
|Julie Boulet
|-
|bgcolor=whitesmoke|Maskinongé
||
|Francine Gaudet 13,240
|
|Rémy Désilets 12,334
|
|Louise-Andrée Garant 9,118
|
|
||
|Rémy Désilets
|-
|-
|bgcolor=whitesmoke|Saint-Maurice
|
|Bob Vallières 8,232
||
|Claude Pinard 8,860
|
|Luc Arvisais 8,201
|
|Kevin Trudel (UFP) 225
||
|Claude Pinard
|-
|bgcolor=whitesmoke|Trois-Rivières
||
|André Gabias 11,034
|
|Guy Julien 10,154
|
|Jean-Claude Ayotte 5,181
|
|Rachel Sauvageau (BP) 274David Lanneville (UFP) 214Marcel Fugère (Ind.) 110Stéphane Robert (DCQ) 76
||
|Guy Julien
|}

Chaudière-Appalaches and Centre-du-Québec

|-
|bgcolor=whitesmoke|Arthabaska
||
|Claude Bachand 12,663
|
|Danièle Caron 9,657
|
|Alain Rayes 11,389
|
|François Houle (Green) 379  Katrine Cyr (BP) 353
||
|Jacques Baril
|-
|bgcolor=whitesmoke|Beauce-Nord
|
|Normand Poulin 11,104
|
|Aline Carrier 4,160
||
|Janvier Grondin 13,275
|
|Julie Roy (BP) 223  Richard Fecteau (UFP) 175
||
|Normand Poulin
|-
|bgcolor=whitesmoke|Beauce-Sud
||
|Diane Leblanc 14,170
|
|Stéphane Pouliot 5,115
|
|Claude Lemieux 12,852
|
|Ginette Lewis (UFP) 216
||
|Diane Leblanc
|-
|bgcolor=whitesmoke|Bellechasse
||
|Dominique Vien 9,658
|
|Claude Lachance 7,084
|
|Serge Carbonneau 8,507
|
|Sylvain Castonguay (Green) 314
Mario Ouellette (UFP) 134
||
|Claude Lachance
|-
|bgcolor=whitesmoke|Chutes-de-la-Chaudière
|
|Pauline Houde-Landry 12,601
|
|Antoine Dubé 10,007
||
|Marc Picard 14,759
|
|Jean Bernatchez (UFP) 649
||
|Denise Carrier-Perreault
|-
|bgcolor=whitesmoke|Drummond
|
|Jean Courchesne 13,479
||
|Normand Jutras 15,200
|
|Patrick Leblanc 7,577
|
|Pascal Allard (Ind.) 393  Gilles Martineau (UFP) 301Robert Dufour (DCQ) 199
||
|Normand Jutras
|-
|bgcolor=whitesmoke|Frontenac
||
|Laurent Lessard 11,251
|
|Marc Boulianne 7,281
|
|Daniel Lamouth 6,888
|
|Bruno Vézina (Green) 231  Marie-Josée Vachon (UFP) 145
||
|Marc Bouliane
|-
|bgcolor=whitesmoke|Johnson
|
|Nicole Brouillette 10,700
||
|Claude Boucher 12,232
|
|Isabelle Marquis 6,612
|
|Martin Marois (UFP) 343  Michel Bélanger (DCQ) 224
||
|Claude Boucher
|-
|bgcolor=whitesmoke|Lévis
||
|Carole Théberge 12,891
|
|Linda Goupil 12,485
|
|Joël Bernier 10,670
|
|Madeleine Provencher (UFP) 442
Richard Larivée (Ind.) 220
||
|Linda Goupil
|-
|bgcolor=whitesmoke|Lotbinière
|
|Monique Drolet-Glazier 8,773
|
|Jean-Guy Paré 6,502
||
|Sylvie Roy 9,522
|
|Marc Allard (Green) 306Étienne Hallé (UFP) 175Paul Biron (DCQ) 150
||
|Jean-Guy Paré
|-
|bgcolor=whitesmoke|Montmagny-L'Islet
||
|Norbert Morin 9,518
|
|Louise Soucy 4,683
|
|Mario Dolan 8,513
|
|Fernand Dorval (UFP) 225
||
|Réal Gauvin
|-
|bgcolor=whitesmoke|Nicolet-Yamaska
|
|Jean Rousseau 8,927
||
|Michel Morin 10,783
|
|Lise Blanchette 5,899
|
|Blak D. Blackburn (BP) 417
Simonne Lizotte (Ind.) 141
||
|Michel Morin
|-
|}

Estrie (Eastern Townships)

|-
|bgcolor=whitesmoke|Mégantic-Compton
||
|Daniel Bouchard 11,135
|
|Suzanne Durivage 7,347
|
|Alain Boisvert 4,901
|
|Christian Poulin (UFP) 193  Frank Moller (Equ.) 71
||
|Madeleine Bélanger
|-
|bgcolor=whitesmoke|Orford
||
|Pierre Reid 17,314
|
|Yvon Bélair 11,037
|
|Steve Bourassa 6,145
|
|Véronique Grenier (UFP) 498
||
|Robert Benoît
|-
|bgcolor=whitesmoke|Richmond
||
|Yvon Vallières 14,767
|
|André Blais 6,149
|
|Pierre Hébert 4,899
|
|
||
|Yvon Vallières
|-
|bgcolor=whitesmoke|Saint-François
||
|Monique Gagnon-Tremblay 16,562
|
|Guillaume Breault-Duncan 9,926
|
|Michel-André Samson 4,541
|
|Suzanne Thériault (UFP) 314  François Boudreau (BP) 310
||
|Monique Gagnon-Tremblay
|-
|bgcolor=whitesmoke|Sherbrooke
||
|Jean Charest 16,403
|
|Marie Malavoy 13,806
|
|Peter Downey 4,169
|
|Normand Gilbert (UFP) 496  Serge Lachapelle (M-L) 64
||
|Jean Charest
|}

Montérégie

|-
|bgcolor=whitesmoke|Beauharnois
|
|Mario Faubert 13,265
||
|Serge Deslières 13,904
|
|Michael Betts 3,338
|
|Rémi Pelletier (Green) 506
||
|Serge DeslièresSalaberry-Soulanges
|-
|bgcolor=whitesmoke|Borduas
|
|Daniel Doucet 9,981
||
|Jean-Pierre Charbonneau 13,840
|
|Patricia St-Jacques 5,282
|
|Raynald St-Onge (BP) 459
||
|Jean-Pierre Charbonneau
|-
|bgcolor=whitesmoke|Brome-Missisquoi
||
|Pierre Paradis 18,546
|
|Lina Le Blanc 8,093
|
|Pierre Plante 6,018
|
|Simon Gnocchini (UFP) 509  Lionel Albert (Equ.) 167
||
|Pierre Paradis
|-
|bgcolor=whitesmoke|Chambly
||
|Diane Legault 17,656
|
|Louise Beaudoin 16,857
|
|Denis Lavoie 6,935
|
|Sébastien Duclos (BP) 744
||
|Louise Beaudoin
|-
|bgcolor=whitesmoke|Châteauguay
||
|Jean-Marc Fournier 20,434
|
|Éric Cardinal 13,751
|
|Daniel Lapointe 4,399
|
|Gilles Lalumière (BP) 547  Guylaine Sirard (UFP) 222 Robert Jason Morgan (Equ.) 93
||
|Jean-Marc Fournier
|-
|bgcolor=whitesmoke|Huntingdon
||
|André Chenail 15,512
|
|François Boileau 8,302
|
|Michel Lavoie 5,261
|
|Kenneth Rimmer (BP) 452
||
|André ChenailBeauharnois-Huntingdon
|-
|bgcolor=whitesmoke|Iberville
||
|Jean Rioux 12,106
|
|Jean-Paul Bergeron 11,185
|
|Lucille Méthé 6,731
|
|Michel Thiffeault (BP) 376  Benoit Lapointe (Green) 298  Guillaume Tremblay (UFP) 229
||
|Jean-Paul Bergeron
|-
|bgcolor=whitesmoke|La Pinière
||
|Fatima Houda-Pepin 22,474
|
|Marcel Lussier 7,934
|
|Gérard Lachance 4,026
|
|Inti Ortega (BP) 487
||
|Fatima Houda-Pepin
|-
|bgcolor=whitesmoke|Laporte
||
|Michel Audet 18,673
|
|Clément Arcand 10,178
|
|Judy Fay 3,885
|
|Christian Montmarquette (UFP) 489  Patrick Fiset (BP) 487  Mary Bevan-Ouellette (Equ.) 106
||
|André Bourbeau
|-
|bgcolor=whitesmoke|La Prairie
||
|Jean Dubuc 15,805
|
|Serge Geoffrion 14,868
|
|Yves-André Ferland 6,478
|
|Marc Bissonnette (BP) 547Danielle Maire (UFP) 229Sylvain Lesage (DCQ) 84
||
|Serge Geoffrion
|-
|bgcolor=whitesmoke|Marguerite-D'Youville
||
|Pierre Moreau 16,368
|
|François Beaulne 15,501
|
|Luc Pommainville 6,596
|
|Yan Lacombe (BP) 550Maxime Babeu (UFP) 536
||
|François Beaulne
|-
|bgcolor=whitesmoke|Marie-Victorin
|
|Jean-Marc Pelletier 9,799
||
|Cécile Vermette 12,736
|
|Michel Lalonde 4,374
|
|Pierre Losier-Côté (BP) 462Marc Lambert (UFP) 452Daniel Tavéra (Ind.) 134
||
|Cécile Vermette
|-
|bgcolor=whitesmoke|Richelieu
|
|Benoît Lefebvre 10,927
||
|Sylvain Simard 13,286
|
|Micheline Ulrich 3,756
|
|Marie-Hélène Charbonneau (BP) 407Nidal Joad (Ind.) 109Steve Ritter (Ind.) 100Florette Villemure-Larochelle (DCQ) 74
||
|Sylvain Simard
|-
|bgcolor=whitesmoke|Saint-Jean
||
|Jean-Pierre Paquin 14,758
|
|Roger Paquin 13,423
|
|Marc-André Legault 6,856
|
|Alexandre Boulerice (UFP) 535Eric Bédard (BP) 462Jean Robert (Ind.) 112Raymond Martin (Ind.) 73
||
|Roger Paquin
|-
|bgcolor=whitesmoke|Saint-Hyacinthe
|
|Pierre Solis 13,137
||
|Léandre Dion 13,870
|
|Bernard Barré 7,855
|
|François Choquette (UFP) 401
||
|Léandre Dion
|-
|bgcolor=whitesmoke|Shefford
||
|Bernard Brodeur 16,391
|
|Jean-François de la Chevrotière 10,073
|
|Sylvain Barré 8,114
|
|Dominic Thibeault (BP) 502  Gilles Dumoulin (UFP) 334
||
|Bernard Brodeur
|-
|bgcolor=whitesmoke|Soulanges
||
|Lucie Charlebois 13,473
|
|Gaëtane Legault 8,753
|
|Pierre Éloi Talbot 3,549
|
|Gloria Sawyer (BP) 327Sandra Stephenson (Green) 320
| style="text-align:center;" colspan=2 |new district
|-
|bgcolor=whitesmoke|Taillon
|
|Annie Evrard 13,120
||
|Pauline Marois 17,603
|
|Katrine Simard 6,353
|
|David Fiset (BP) 556Gabriel Landry (UFP) 545Xavier Rochon (Ind.) 216
||
|Pauline Marois
|-
|bgcolor=whitesmoke|Vachon
|
|Brigitte Mercier 12,741
||
|Camil Bouchard 12,960
|
|Joëlle Lescop 5,540
|
|Denis Durand (BP) 519Richard St-Onge (UFP) 279
||
|David Payne
|-
|bgcolor=whitesmoke|Vaudreuil
||
|Yvon Marcoux 18,490
|
|Carole Cardinal 9,474
|
|Luc Tison 3,487
|
|Kathleen Mary Mangin (BP) 488Ernest Semple (Equ.) 120
||
|Yvon Marcoux
|-
|bgcolor=whitesmoke|Verchères
|
|Mario Lebrun 8,720
||
|Bernard Landry 16,963
|
|François Pratte 4,585
|
|Sébastien Drouin (BP) 505Marc-André Morvan (UFP) 195
||
|Bernard Landry
|}

Montreal

East

|-
|bgcolor=whitesmoke|Anjou
||
|Lise Thériault 17,572
|
|France Bachand 10,573
|
|Martin Janson 4,319
|
|Hélène Héroux (M-L) 266
||
|Lise Thériault
|-
|rowspan=3 bgcolor=whitesmoke|Bourassa-Sauvé
|rowspan=3 |
|rowspan=3 |Line Beauchamp 20,175
|rowspan=3 |
|rowspan=3 |Kettly Beauregard 8,243
|rowspan=3 |
|rowspan=3 |Michelle Allaire 3,771
|rowspan=3 |
|rowspan=3 |Francis Mallette (Green) 327  Sylvain Archambault (Ind.) 261  Denis Gagné (DCQ) 119  Claude Brunelle (M-L) 94  Boris Mospan (Equ.) 44
||
|Michèle Lamquin-ÉthierBourassa
|-
| style="text-align:center;" colspan=2 |merged district
|-
||
| Line BeauchampSauvé
|-
|bgcolor=whitesmoke|Bourget
|
|Claude Paquette 11,290
||
|Diane Lemieux 15,074
|
|Pierre Bourque 5,747
|
|Steve Boudrias (BP) 469  Rosanne Labelle (UFP) 418  Claudette Deschamps (DCQ) 193
||
|Diane Lemieux
|-
|bgcolor=whitesmoke|Crémazie
||
|Michèle Lamquin-Éthier 15,498
|
|Hugues Cormier 13,979
|
|Manon St-Louis 4,057
|
|Jocelyne Desautels (UFP) 686  Claude Trudel (Green) 399  Phillippe Beauvais (BP) 306  Marsha Fine (M-L) 90
||
|Manon Blanchet
|-
|bgcolor=whitesmoke|Gouin
|
|William Aguilar 8,996
||
|André Boisclair 15,890
|
|Stéphane Deschênes 2,456
|
|Colette Provost (UFP) 1,397  Pierrette Chevalier (Green) 584  Hugô St-Onge (BP) 465
||
|André Boisclair
|-
|bgcolor=whitesmoke|Hochelaga-Maisonneuve
|
|Richer Dompierre 6,210
||
|Louise Harel 13,138
|
|Louise Blackburn 2,449
|
|Lise Alarie (UFP) 788  Alex Néron (BP) 476  Daniel Breton (Green) 367  Christine Dandenault (M-L) 79  Mario Richard (DCQ) 52
||
|Louise Harel
|-
|rowspan=3 bgcolor=whitesmoke|Jeanne-Mance–Viger
|rowspan=3 |
|rowspan=3 |Michel Bissonnet 26,801
|rowspan=3 |
|rowspan=3 |Robert La Rose 4,303
|rowspan=3 |
|rowspan=3 |Carole Giroux 2,080
|rowspan=3 |
|rowspan=3 |Eddy Guarino (BP) 365
||
|Michel Bissonnet  Jeanne-Mance
|-
| style="text-align:center;" colspan=2 |merged district
|-
||
| Anna MancusoViger
|-
|bgcolor=whitesmoke|LaFontaine
||
|Tony Tomassi 18,164
|
|Line Pelletier 4,939
|
|Josée Anello 2,697
|
|Patrick Forcier (BP) 323
||
|Jean-Claude Gobé
|-
|bgcolor=whitesmoke|Laurier-Dorion
||
|Christos Sirros 16,052
|
|Tomas Arbieto 9,775
|
|Mario Spina 1,996
|
|William Sloan (UFP) 922  Phillippe Morlighem (Green) 595  Sylvain Mainville (BP) 375  Peter Macrisopoulos (M-L) 165  Charles Robidoux (Ind.) 131  Sylvie Charbin (Ind.) 117  Yang Zhang (Equ.) 78
||
|Christos Sirros
|-
|bgcolor=whitesmoke|Mercier
|
|Nathalie Rochefort 8,414
||
|Daniel Turp 13,334
|
|Vivian Goulder 1,855
|
|Amir Khadir (UFP) 5,278  Lyne Rivard (BP) 579
||
|Nathalie Rochefort
|-
|bgcolor=whitesmoke|Pointe-aux-Trembles
|
|Daniel Fournier 9,427
||
|Nicole Léger 14,261
|
|André Cordeau 4,050
|
|Xavier Daxhelet (Green) 457  Julien Ferron (DCQ) 137  Geneviève Royer (M-L) 80
||
|Nicole Léger
|-
|bgcolor=whitesmoke|Rosemont
|
|Marylin Thomas 14,721
||
|Rita Dionne-Marsolais 16,143
|
|Denise Larouche 4,248
|
|Omar Aktouf (UFP) 1,132  Huguette Plourde (BP) 493  Suzelle Gill (DCQ) 147
||
|Rita Dionne-Marsolais
|-
|bgcolor=whitesmoke|Sainte-Marie–Saint-Jacques
|
|Richard Brosseau 7,989
||
|André Boulerice 13,066
|
|Annick Brousseau 2,183
|
|Gaétan Breton (UFP) 1,699  Robert Ruffo (Green) 690  Antoine Théorêt-Poupart (BP) 444  Ginette Boutet (M-L) 87  Maria da Luz dos Santos Inacio (DCQ) 59
||
|André Boulerice
|-
|bgcolor=whitesmoke|Viau
||
|William Cusano 17,703
|
|Maka Kotto 6,142
|
|Paolo Tamburello 2,406
|
|Guillaume Blouin-Beaudoin (BP) 426  Jocelyne Dupuis (UFP) 324  Yannick Duguay (Ind.) 121
||
|William Cusano
|}

West

|-
|bgcolor=whitesmoke|Acadie
||
|Yvan Bordeleau 23,211
|
|Maria Mourani 6,702
|
|Jean-Pierre Chamoun 2,253
|
|Johnathan Bérubé (BP) 440  André Parizeau (Ind.) 161  Linda Sullivan (M-L) 111  Marina Paümann (Equ.) 95
||
|Yvan Bordeleau
|-
|bgcolor=whitesmoke|D'Arcy-McGee
||
|Lawrence Bergman 23,968
|
|Mathieu Breault 1,087
|
|Sylvain James Bowes 520
|
|William Shaw (Equ.) 406  Blair Longley (BP) 274
||
|Lawrence Bergman
|-
|bgcolor=whitesmoke|Jacques-Cartier
||
|Geoffrey Kelley 30,035
|
|Guy Amyot 1,894
|
|Jeffrey Penney 1,253
|
|Ryan Young (Green) 727  Keith Henderson (Equ.) 650  Daniel Cormier-Roach (Ind.) 49
||
|Geoffrey Kelley
|-
|bgcolor=whitesmoke|Marguerite-Bourgeoys
||
|Monique Jérôme-Forget 22,807
|
|Suzanne Groulx 6,327
|
|Brigitte De Laroche 2,524
|
|Adam Jastrzebski (Green) 415  Paul Domagala (Equ.) 142  Marc Veilleux (DCQ) 94  Yves le Seigle (M-L) 68
||
|Monique Jérôme-Forget
|-
|bgcolor=whitesmoke|Marquette
||
|François Ouimet 21,232
|
|Yves Beauregard 7,672
|
|Denise Décoste 3,260
|
|Bruce Hulley (Equ.) 289  Garnet Colly (M-L) 179
||
|François Ouimet
|-
|bgcolor=whitesmoke|Mont-Royal
||
|Philippe Couillard 21,021
|
|Vincent Gagnon 3,465
|
|Nour-Eddine Hajibi 1,240
|
|Frank Kiss (Equ.) 256
||
|André Tranchemontagne
|-
|bgcolor=whitesmoke|Nelligan
||
|Russell Williams 27,934
|
|Micaël Poirier 4,611
|
|Sabrina Duguay 2,680
|
|Peter Graham (Green) 541  Giuliana Pendenza (Equ.) 233
||
|Russell Williams
|-
|bgcolor=whitesmoke|Notre-Dame-de-Grâce
||
|Russell Copeman 18,911
|
|Laurent Malépart 3,460
|
|Allan Patrick 1,225
|
|Jessica Gal (Green) 1,084  Helene Jutras (BP) 261  Peter Sauvé (Equ.) 246  Thomas Kernan (DCQ) 96  Rachel Hoffman (M-L) 71
||
|Russell Copeman
|-
|bgcolor=whitesmoke|Outremont
||
|Yves Séguin 14,278
|
|Marilyse Lapierre 8,218
|
|Christian de Serres 1,712
|
|Jill Hanley (UFP) 1,818  Maryève Daigle (BP) 345  Louise Charron (M-L) 119
||
|Pierre-Étienne Laporte
|-
|bgcolor=whitesmoke|Robert-Baldwin
||
|Pierre Marsan 28,892
|
|Alphonse Boisrond 2,637
|
|Alladin Abou Sharbin 1,705
|
|Jimmy Kalafatidis (Equ.) 411
||
|Pierre Marsan
|-
|bgcolor=whitesmoke|Saint-Henri–Sainte-Anne
||
|Nicole Loiselle 16,004
|
|Raymond Munger 9,830
|
|Claudette Marullo 2,645
|
|Marc-André Payette (UFP) 595  Suzanne Moussette (Green) 439  Nicky Tanguay (BP) 424  Andrzej Jastrzebski (DCQ) 142  Jean-Paul Bédard (M-L) 116  Larry Vitas (Equ.) 52
||
|Nicole Loiselle
|-
|bgcolor=whitesmoke|Saint-Laurent
||
|Jacques Dupuis 24,745
|
|William Fayad 4,556
|
|Sophie Theoharopoulos 1,834
|
|Alain Pérusse (UFP) 325  Fernand Deschamps (M-L) 206  Louis Ottoni (Equ.) 199
||
|Jacques Dupuis
|-
|bgcolor=whitesmoke|Verdun
||
|Henri-François Gautrin 15,185
|
|Denis Martel 8,782
|
|Sébastien Guérin 3,269
|
|Claude Genest (Green) 658  Pascal Durand (UFP) 368  Vincent Aubry (BP) 357  Gilles Noël (DCQ) 104  Normand Chouinard (M-L) 71  Bernard King (Equ.) 63  Robert Lindblad (Ind.) 54
||
|Henri-François Gautrin
|-
|bgcolor=whitesmoke|Westmount–Saint-Louis
||
|Jacques Chagnon 18,330
|
|Denise Laroche 2,372
|
|Nathalie Beaupré 959
|
|David Fennario (UFP) 718  David John Proctor (BP) 223  Don Donderi (Equ.) 182  Diane Johnston (M-L) 64
||
|Jacques Chagnon
|}

Laval

|-
|bgcolor=whitesmoke|Chomedey
||
|Thomas Mulcair 25,363
|
|Coline Chhay 6,568
|
|Vicken Darakdijian 3,384
|
|Polyvios Tsakanikas (M-L) 210  Robert Tamilia (Equ.) 148
||
|Thomas Mulcair
|-
|bgcolor=whitesmoke|Fabre
||
|Michelle Courchesne 18,689
|
|Nathalie Saint-Pierre 14,428
|
|Claude Dugas 6,370
|
|Pierre Bibeau (Ind.) 402
||
|Joseph Facal
|-
|bgcolor=whitesmoke|Laval-des-Rapides
||
|Alain Paquet 15,190
|
|Serge Ménard 13,209
|
|Philippe Laurin 4,693
|
|Louis-Philippe Verenka (Green) 366  Vincent Pelletier (BP) 339  Michelle Marleau (DCQ) 162
||
|Serge Ménard
|-
|bgcolor=whitesmoke|Mille-Îles
||
|Maurice Clermont 19,924
|
|Maude Delangis 14,333
|
|Gerry La Rocca 5,093
|
|Christian Lajoie (Ind.) 244  Régent Millette (DCQ) 113
||
|Lyse Leduc
|-
|bgcolor=whitesmoke|Vimont
||
|Vincent Auclair 17,908
|
|Normand Dupont 12,865
|
|François Gaudreau 7,227
|
|Serge Légaré (Green) 403  André Pigeon (UFP) 269
||
|François Gaudreau
|-
|}

Laurentides

|-
|bgcolor=whitesmoke|Argenteuil
||
|David Whissell 12,645
|
|Georges Lapointe 5,906
|
|Sylvain Demers 4,372
|
|Claude Sabourin (Green) 496  Yannick Charpentier (BP) 292
||
|David Whissell
|-
|bgcolor=whitesmoke|Bertrand
|
|Michelle Montpetit 13,502
||
|Claude Cousineau 14,704
|
|Danielle Tremblay 4,834
|
|Richard Savignac (Green) 664  Serge Haroun (DCQ) 490  David Rovins (Ind.) 41
||
|Claude Cousineau
|-
|bgcolor=whitesmoke|Blainville
|
|Jocelyne Roch 12,689
||
|Richard Legendre 15,288
|
|Diane Bellemare 7,407
|
|Thérèse Hamel (UFP) 394
||
|Richard Legendre
|-
|bgcolor=whitesmoke|Deux-Montagnes
|
|Marc Lauzon 12,099
||
|Hélène Robert 12,432
|
|Éric Duhaime 6,907
|
|Julien Demers (UFP) 408
||
|Hélène Robert
|-
|bgcolor=whitesmoke|Groulx
||
|Pierre Descoteaux 13,763
|
|Robert Kieffer 13,460
|
|Sophie Cardinal 6,746
|
|Denis Letourneux (UFP) 436  Julien Boisvert (BP) 402
||
|Robert Kieffer
|-
|bgcolor=whitesmoke|Labelle
|
|Jean-Pierre Miljours 10,501
||
|Sylvain Pagé 13,530
|
|Pascal De Bellefeuille 4,283
|
|Anne Léger (Green) 468  André Haché (BP) 274
||
|Sylvain Pagé
|-
|bgcolor=whitesmoke|Mirabel
|
|Réal Proulx 7,529
||
|Denise Beaudoin 10,577
|
|Hubert Meilleur 9,486
|
|
|colspan=2 align=center|new district
|-
|bgcolor=whitesmoke|Prévost
|
|Marie-Josée Gouin 11,855
||
|Lucie Papineau 16,159
|
|Martin Camirand 7,087
|
|Alexandre Émond (BP) 499  Reine Dubeau (DCQ) 179
||
|Lucie Papineau
|-
|}

Lanaudière

|-
|bgcolor=whitesmoke|Berthier
|
|Carole Majeau 10,828
||
|Alexandre Bourdeau 12,101
|
|Marie Grégoire 11,014
|
|Pierre Gravel (UFP) 632
||
|Marie Grégoire
|-
|bgcolor=whitesmoke|Joliette
|
|Robert Groulx 11,161
||
|Jonathan Valois 13,103
|
|Sylvie Lespérance 7,114
|
|Mathieu Lessard (UFP) 1,149
Marco Geoffroy (BP) 667 
||
|Sylvie Lespérance
|-
|bgcolor=whitesmoke|L'Assomption
|
|Sylvie Thouin 14,111
||
|Jean-Claude St-André 16,965
|
|Daniel Labrecque 7,053
|
|Bob Aubin (Green) 602
Gilbert Morin (UFP) 356
||
|Jean-Claude St-André
|-
|bgcolor=whitesmoke|Masson
|
|Richard Marcotte 11,371
||
|Luc Thériault 15,445
|
|Nathalie Filion 7,637
|
|
||
|Gilles Labbé
|-
|bgcolor=whitesmoke|Rousseau
|
|Michel F. Brunet 9,127
||
|François Legault 14,079
|
|François Girouard 5,645
|
|Alex Boisdequin-Lefort (UFP) 324Gérard Gauthier (DCQ) 249
||
|François Legault
|-
|bgcolor=whitesmoke|Terrebonne
|
|Marcel Théorêt 11,353
||
|Jocelyne Caron 17,327
|
|Jean-Pierre Parrot 6,463
|
|Marco Legrand (UFP) 440
||
|Jocelyne Caron
|-
|}

Outaouais and Abitibi-Témiscamingue 

|-
|bgcolor=whitesmoke|Abitibi-Est
||
|Pierre Corbeil 9,056
|
|Lorraine Morissette 7,110
|
|Serge Allard 4,477
|
|Guy Cloutier (BP) 286  Samuel Dupras-Doroftei (Ind.) 202
||
|André Pelletier
|-
|bgcolor=whitesmoke|Abitibi-Ouest
|
|Jean-Louis Carignan 7,960
||
|François Gendron 9,677
|
|Claude Morin 3,661
|
|
||
|François Gendron
|-
|bgcolor=whitesmoke|Rouyn-Noranda–Témiscamingue
||
|Daniel Bernard 10,347
|
|Rémy Trudel 9,673
|
|Pierre Brien 7,849
|
|Patrick Rancourt (UFP) 507
||
|Rémy Trudel
|-
|bgcolor=whitesmoke|Chapleau
||
|Benoît Pelletier 18,774
|
|Sylvie Simard 6,512
|
|Berthe Miron 3,949
|
|Daniel Leblanc-Poirier (BP) 402  Jean Marois (UFP) 331  Gabriel Girard-Bernier (M-L) 122 
||
|Benoît Pelletier
|-
|bgcolor=whitesmoke|Gatineau
||
|Réjean Lafrenière 16,481
|
|Dominique Bedwell 6,663
|
|Brian Gibb 3,494
|
|Julie Mercier (UFP) 423  Françoise Roy (M-L) 95
||
|Réjean Lafrenière
|-
|bgcolor=whitesmoke|Hull
||
|Roch Cholette 16,262
|
|Raphaël Déry 7,234
|
|Jean-François LaRue 3,663
|
|Denise Veilleux (UFP) 677  Stéphane Salko (BP) 305  Maxime Gauld (Ind.) 155  Benoit Legros (M-L) 72  Gheorghe Irimia (Ind.) 37
||
|Roch Cholette
|-
|bgcolor=whitesmoke|Papineau
||
|Norman MacMillan 17,933
|
|Gilles Hébert 8,279
|
|Serge Charette 3,833
|
|Nathalie Gratton (Green) 576  Dominique Marceau (UFP) 286
||
|Norman MacMillan
|-
|bgcolor=whitesmoke|Pontiac
||
|Charlotte L'Écuyer 17,885
|
|Luc Côté 3,133
|
|Victor Bilodeau 1,830
|
|Serge Tanguay (UFP) 392  Louis Lang (M-L) 132
||
|Robert Middlemiss
|-
|}

See also
 Politics of Quebec
 List of premiers of Quebec
 List of leaders of the Official Opposition (Quebec)
 National Assembly of Quebec
 2007 Quebec general election
 Timeline of Quebec history
 Political parties in Quebec
 37th National Assembly of Quebec

References

Further reading

External links 
 Results by party (total votes and seats won)
 Results for all ridings

Quebec general election
Elections in Quebec
General election
Quebec general election